The MBC+ Drama was a free-to-air television channel owned by MBC Group. It was a joint venture between OSN and MBC Group. It was a 24-hour Arabic channel that offers a range of Arabic series First on TV to OSN subscribers starting 1 February 2009.

MBC+ Drama claims to offer programs up to 3 months before any other channel. MBC+ Drama is the only channel among its sister channels at MBC Group that requires subscription.

On 1 January 2016, MBC + Drama HD stopped broadcasting and was replaced with an OSN Ya Hala! Cinema HD promo due to MBC focusing on an alternative free-to-air channel MBC Drama and paid on-demand service Shahid VIP.

As of October 2016, it has returned, but the logo has changed color from orange to purple and is now a pay-per-view channel with the same format as before.

Programming

Arab world 
 Ahl al-Gharām
 Aswār
 Gārī Yā Hammūda
 Khams Khawāt

Telenovelas 
 Corazón valiente

References

External links

 

Television stations in the United Arab Emirates
Defunct television channels
Television stations in Saudi Arabia
Arab mass media
Arabic-language television stations
Free-to-air
Movie channels
Television channels and stations established in 2009
Television channels and stations disestablished in 2011
Middle East Broadcasting Center
Pay-per-view television services